The 1883 Dartmouth football team represented Dartmouth College in the 1883 college football season.

Schedule

References

Dartmouth
Dartmouth Big Green football seasons
College football winless seasons
Dartmouth football